Orr Island is an ice-covered island  long, lying  southwest of Grinder Island in Marshall Archipelago, off the coast of Marie Byrd Land. Mapped by United States Geological Survey (USGS) from surveys and U.S. Navy air photos, 1959–65. Named by Advisory Committee on Antarctic Names (US-ACAN) for Lieutenant Commander Thomas E. Orr, Supply Officer and Officer-in-Charge of the Para Rescue Team of U.S. Navy Squadron VX-6 during Operation Deep Freeze 1968.

See also 
 List of Antarctic and sub-Antarctic islands

Islands of Marie Byrd Land